Peter William Mayhew (19 May 1944 – 30 April 2019) was a British-American actor. He was best known for portraying Chewbacca in the Star Wars film series. He played the character in all of his live-action appearances from the 1977 original to 2015's The Force Awakens before his retirement from the role.

Early life
Peter Mayhew was born on 19 May 1944, in Barnes, Surrey. At the age of 8, he was diagnosed with gigantism. Some news outlets have mistakenly reported that he either "[did] not have gigantism" or that he had Marfan syndrome.

Career

Early work
Mayhew gained his first acting job when the producers of Sinbad and the Eye of the Tiger (1977) discovered him from a photograph in a newspaper article about men with large feet, and cast him in the role of the Minoton.

Star Wars
When casting the original Star Wars (1977), director George Lucas needed a tall actor who could fit the role of the hairy alien Chewbacca. He originally had in mind  bodybuilder David Prowse, but Prowse chose to play Darth Vader. This led Lucas to cast Mayhew, who was working as an orderly in the A & E Dept Mayday University Hospital, Thornton Heath, Croydon. Surrey. He became aware of a casting call for Star Wars which was filming at Elstree Studios in Hertfordshire. Mayhew continued working as an orderly, at Mayday Hospital (now Croydon University Hospital), in between filming the original Star Wars trilogy.

Mayhew modelled his performance of Chewbacca after researching the behaviour of bears, monkeys and gorillas he saw at London Zoo. Lucas said Mayhew was "the closest any human being could be to a Wookiee: big heart, gentle nature and I learnt to always let him win". The character did not have any lines, the sounds he made being derived from sound recordings of animal noises.

Mayhew played Chewbacca in five Star Wars films: the original trilogy (Star Wars, The Empire Strikes Back and Return of the Jedi), Star Wars: Episode III – Revenge of the Sith and Star Wars: The Force Awakens. He played the role in the 1978 television film Star Wars Holiday Special and in a 1980 appearance on The Muppet Show. He also recorded dialogue for the Star Wars: The Clone Wars Season 3 finale episode "Wookiee Hunt".

Mayhew played the role in commercials and hospital appearances for sick children, and made numerous appearances as Chewbacca outside the Star Wars films. Mayhew, appearing as Chewbacca, was honoured with a Lifetime Achievement Award at the MTV Film Awards 1997.

He also made other media appearances outside of playing Chewbacca. He appeared on NBC's Identity, where his identity was based on the fact that he played Chewbacca and was a frequent guest in the early days of Slice of SciFi.

While Mayhew portrayed Chewbacca in Star Wars: The Force Awakens, he was not in Star Wars: The Last Jedi but was listed in the credits as "Chewbacca Consultant". Mayhew retired from playing Chewbacca due to health issues. Joonas Suotamo shared the portrayal of Chewbacca with Mayhew in Star Wars: The Force Awakens, and then completely replaced him in subsequent Star Wars films.

Other work
Outside Star Wars, Mayhew appeared in the 1978 horror film Terror, directed by Norman J. Warren. In the English version of Dragon Ball GT: A Hero's Legacy, he provided the voice for Susha. He also appeared in Yesterday Was a Lie.

Books
Mayhew wrote two books for younger audiences: Growing Up Giant, which explains that being different is a strength instead of a weakness, and the anti-bullying book for children My Favorite Giant.

Personal life and death
Peter Mayhew married Mary Angelique "Angie" Luker (née Cigainero), a native of Texas, in 1999. The two lived in Boyd, Texas. Peter was the stepfather to Mary's three children. It was reported that his wife would head his namesake charity, the Peter Mayhew Foundation.

Mayhew became a naturalised citizen of the United States in 2005 at a ceremony in Arlington, Texas. In an interview with the Fort Worth Star-Telegram, he joked that he did not get a medal at this ceremony either, a reference to the closing scene in Star Wars during which Luke Skywalker and Han Solo get medals, but Chewbacca does not. Mayhew noted in an MTV interview that although Chewbacca does not get a medal in the film, he does have the last line of dialogue, when he roars.

Mayhew underwent double knee replacement surgery in 2013, having been a full-time wheelchair user for the previous two years and still largely reliant on it at the time of filming The Force Awakens. In July 2018, Mayhew announced via Twitter that he had successfully undergone unspecified spinal surgery to improve his mobility, and was recovering.

Mayhew died of a heart attack on 30 April 2019, at his home in Boyd, Texas, three weeks before his 75th birthday. He was buried in Reno, Parker County, Texas, in Azleland Memorial Park and Mausoleum.

Filmography

Film

Television

See also
 List of tallest people

References

External links

 
 Star Wars bio
 Interview with Peter Mayhew on Slice of SciFi (starts at 36:55 of show)
 

1944 births
2019 deaths
20th-century American male actors
20th-century English male actors
21st-century American male actors
21st-century English male actors
American male film actors
American male television actors
American male voice actors
English emigrants to the United States
English male film actors
English male television actors
English male voice actors
Male actors from London
People with acquired American citizenship
People from Barnes, London
People from Boyd, Texas
People with Marfan syndrome
Writers from London
Writers from Texas